Stanley Owen Buckmaster, 1st Viscount Buckmaster,  (9 January 1861 – 5 December 1934) was a British lawyer and Liberal Party politician. He was a Member of Parliament (MP) for most of the years from 1906 to 1915, when he was elevated to the peerage and served as Lord Chancellor under H. H. Asquith from 1915 to 1916.

Background and education
Buckmaster was born on 9 January 1861 to John Charles Buckmaster, of Ashleigh, Hampton Wick, by his wife Emily Anne Goodliffe. His father began life as an agricultural labourer, and rose to teach chemistry at the Imperial College of Science and Technology. He was educated at Aldenham School and Christ Church, Oxford, where he took second class honours in mathematics. He was called to the Bar in 1884 at the Inner Temple. Beginning with a general practice on the Midland circuit, he eventually came to acquire a large Chancery practice. He was appointed King's Counsel in April 1902. The same year he joined Lincoln's Inn.

Political career
At the 1906 general election, Buckmaster was elected as MP for Cambridge, winning the seat from the Conservatives with a majority of less than 4%.
At the January 1910 general election, he lost the seat to the Conservative Almeric Paget on a 5% swing. He contested Cambridge again at the December 1910 election, but made only a small dent in the Conservative majority.

Buckmaster returned to the Commons the following year, when he was elected at a by-election in October 1911 for the safe Liberal seat of Keighley in Yorkshire. He was knighted in 1913 on his appointment as Solicitor general, when he was comfortably re-elected in the ministerial by-election.

He was a Member of the Council of the Duchy of Lancaster and served under H. H. Asquith as Solicitor-General from 1913 to 1915. Buckmaster was also Counsel to the University of Oxford from 1911 to 1913, Director of The Press Bureau, 1914 to 1915, and a member of The Interallied Conference on Finance and Supplies.

Lord Chancellor 
In 1915, Asquith was forced to form a Coalition government. The Conservatives insisted on the removal of Lord Haldane as Lord Chancellor, and after Sir John Simon refused the post Buckmaster was appointed instead. He was sworn of the Privy Council and raised to the peerage as Baron Buckmaster, of Cheddington in the County of Buckingham.

Buckmaster was Lord Chancellor for only eighteen months, resigning alongside Asquith in December 1916. His tenure was largely overshadowed by the war. He only appointed two High Court judges—Peterson and McCardie—and no new King's Counsel, on the grounds that junior barrister engaged in war service would be disadvantaged. Sitting judicially, he gave the decision in Cook v Deeks, a notable company law case. As a member of the Cabinet, he also took part in decision concerning war strategy.

Lord of Appeal 
After stepping down from the woolsack, Buckmaster continued to sit judicially as a Lord of Appeal, except for a time when he left his judicial work to go into the City. In Bowman v. Secular Society he held that a company formed for the purpose of challenging Christianity was not illegal. In Donoghue v Stevenson he gave a dissenting opinion against the extension of the duty of care. He was highly regarded as a judge by his colleagues: Lord Birkenhead described him as "a consummate judge" and Lord Dunedin regarded him as the greatest colleague he had on the bench.

He later served as Chairman of the Governing Body of Imperial College of Science and Technology and as Chairman of the Political Honours Review Committee between 1924 and 1929. He was appointed GCVO in 1930 and was made Viscount Buckmaster, of Cheddington in the County of Buckingham, in 1933.

He died on 5 December 1934 in London, England.

Family
Buckmaster married Edith Augusta Lewin, daughter of Spencer Robert Lewin, in 1889. Their eldest daughter, the Hon. Margaret Buckmaster (later Pollock), was an author, social reformer and Labour Party activist. Their youngest daughter, the Hon. Barbara Buckmaster (later Miller), was the mother of the Conservative politician Hal Miller. Buckmaster died in London in December 1934, aged 73, and was cremated at Golders Green Crematorium. He was succeeded in his titles by his only son, Owen. Lady Buckmaster died in October 1935. His niece, Hilda Buckmaster was also active in politics, three times standing as a parliamentary candidate for the Liberal Party.

Arms

References

Further reading
For a fuller biography see William Goodhart, ‘Buckmaster, Stanley Owen, first Viscount Buckmaster (1861–1934), Oxford Dictionary of National Biography, Oxford University Press, 2004.

External links 

 

Lord chancellors of Great Britain
Solicitors General for England and Wales
Buckmaster, Stanley
Buckmaster, Stanley
Buckmaster, Stanley
UK MPs who were granted peerages
Members of the Privy Council of the United Kingdom
Alumni of Christ Church, Oxford
People educated at Aldenham School
People associated with Imperial College London
Viscounts in the Peerage of the United Kingdom
Knights Grand Cross of the Royal Victorian Order
1861 births
1934 deaths
Members of the Inner Temple
Law lords
Members of the Judicial Committee of the Privy Council
Knights Bachelor
Members of Lincoln's Inn
English King's Counsel
20th-century King's Counsel
English barristers
Barons created by George V
Viscounts created by George V